The 1978 LSU Tigers football team represented Louisiana State University (LSU) during the 1978 NCAA Division I-A football season.  Under head coach Charles McClendon, the Tigers had a record of 8–4 with a Southeastern Conference record of 3–3. It was McClendon's 17th season as head coach at LSU.

Schedule

Roster

Game summaries

Wyoming
Hokie Gajan ran the opening kickoff back 99 yards for a touchdown and Charles Alexander passed the 4,000 career rushing yard mark for his career.

References

LSU
LSU Tigers football seasons
LSU Tigers football